Xuyun or Hsu Yun (5 September 1840? – 13 October 1959) was a renowned Chinese  Chan Buddhist master and an influential Buddhist teacher of the 19th and 20th centuries.

Early life
Xuyun was purportedly born on 5 September 1840 in Fujian, Qing China. His original name was Xiao Guyan. He was the son of Xiao Yutang and his mother was surnamed Yan. His mother died during childbirth. Guyan's grandmother insisted that her grandson take a wife. In order to continue both his and his uncle's lineage, Guyan was arranged to marry one woman from the Tian family and one from the Tan family.

His first exposure to Buddhism was during the funeral of his grandmother. Soon afterward he began reading Buddhist sutras and later made a pilgrimage to Mount Heng, one of the most important Buddhist sites in China.

When he was fourteen years old, he announced that  he wished to renounce the material world in favour of monastic life. His father did not approve of Buddhism and had him instructed in Taoism instead. Guyan was dissatisfied with Taoism, which he felt could not reach the deeper truths of existence. The storerooms of his house were full of very old books. Going through them, he found a volume called the 'Story of Incense Mountain' (cf. Guanyin#Miaoshan), which described the life of Guanyin. After reading the book, he was deeply influenced and was inspired to go forth from home to monkhood to practice Buddhism.

When Xuyun was seventeen, he attempted to flee to Mount Heng to become a monk without his family's permission. On a winding mountain path, he encountered envoys sent by his uncle to intercept and escort him back. His aspiration was not realized, and he was caught and brought back home. When he arrived home, the family feared that he would escape again, so he was sent with his first cousin, Fu Kuo, to Quanzhou. His father formally received two brides from the Tian and Tan families for Xuyun, and his marriage was completed. Although they lived together, Xuyun did not have sexual contact with his wives. Moreover, he extensively explained the dharma to them so that they too would practice Buddhism.

Fu Kuo also had previously explored Buddhism and had the same aspiration as Xuyun, so they amicably traveled the Path together. In his nineteenth year, accompanied by Fu Kuo, he started the journey to Gu Shan (Drum Mountain) in Fuzhou to leave home. Before leaving, he wrote the "Song of the Skinbag" which he left behind for his two wives.

It was at Gu Shan monastery that his head was shaved and he received ordination as a monk. When his father sent agents to find him, Xuyun concealed himself in a grotto behind the monastery, where he lived in solitude for three years. At the age of twenty-five, Xuyun learned that his father had died, and his stepmother and two wives had entered the monastic life.

During his years as a hermit, Xuyun made some of his most profound discoveries. He visited the old master Yung Ching, who encouraged him to abandon his extreme asceticism in favor of temperance. He instructed the young monk in the sutras and told him to be mindful of the Hua Tou, "Who is dragging this corpse of mine?" In his thirty-sixth year, with the encouragement of Yung Ching, Xuyun went on a seven-year pilgrimage to Mount Putuo off the coast of Ningbo, a place regarded by Buddhists as the bodhimaṇḍa of Avalokiteśvara. He went on to visit the Temple of King Ashoka and various Chan holy places.

Middle Age and Enlightenment

At age forty-three, Xuyun had by now left home life for more than twenty years, but he had not yet completed his practice in the Path. He had not repaid his parents' kindness, and so he vowed to again make a pilgrimage to Nan Hai. From Fa Hua Temple all the way to Ch'ing Liang Peak at Mount Wutai of the northwest, the bodhimanda of Manjushri, he made one full prostration every three steps. He prayed for the rebirth of his parents in the Pure Land. Along the way, Xuyun is said to have met a beggar called Wen Chi, who twice saved his life. After talking with the monks at the Five-Peaked Mountain, Xuyun came to believe that the beggar had been an incarnation of Manjushri.

Having achieved singleness of mind, Xuyun traveled west and south, making his way through Tibet. He visited many monasteries and holy places, including Sichuan's Mount Emei, the bodhimanda of Samantabhadra Bodhisattva, the Potala, the seat of the Dalai Lama, and Tashilhunpo Monastery, the seat of the Panchen Lama. He traveled through India and Ceylon, and then across the sea to Burma. During this time of wandering, he felt his mind clearing and his health growing stronger. Xuyun composed a large number of poems during this period.

After returning to China, during Xuyun's fifty-third year, he joined with other Venerable Masters Pu Zhao, Yue Xia, and Yin Lian (Lotus Seal) to cultivate together. They climbed Mount Jiuhua (bodhimanda of Ksitigarbha Bodhisattva) and repaired the huts on Cui Feng Summit, where Dharma Master Pu Zhao expounded the Mahavaipulyabuddha Avatamsaka (Flower Adornment) Sutra.

When Xuyun was fifty-six, the Abbot Yue Lang of Gaomin Temple in Yangzhou was going to convene a continuous twelve-week session of dhyana meditation. Preparing to leave, the group asked Xuyun to go first. After reaching Di Gang, he had to cross the water, but had no money. The ferry left without him. As he walked along the river's edge, he suddenly lost his footing and fell into the rushing water, where he bobbed helplessly for a day and night  and was caught in a fisherman's net. He was carried to a nearby temple, where he was revived and treated for his injuries. Feeling ill, he nevertheless returned to Yangzhou. When asked by Gao Ming whether he would participate in the upcoming weeks of meditation, he politely declined, without revealing his illness. The temple had rules that those who were invited had to attend or else face punishment. In the end, Gao Ming had Xuyun beaten with a wooden ruler. He willingly accepted this punishment, although it worsened his condition.

For the next several days, Xuyun sat in continuous meditation. In his autobiography, he wrote: "[in] the purity of my singleness of mind, I forgot all about my body. Twenty days later, my illness vanished completely. From that moment, with all my thoughts entirely wiped out, my practice took effect throughout the day and night. My steps were as swift as if I was flying in the air. One evening, after meditation, I opened my eyes and suddenly saw I was in brightness similar to broad daylight in which I could see everything inside and outside the monastery..." But he knew that this occurrence was only a mental state, and that it was not at all rare. He did not become attached to this achievement, but continued his single-minded investigation of the topic, "who is mindful of the Buddha?" over and over again, he delved into this topic without interruption.

Xuyun composed a commemorative verse for the oft-cited moment of profound insight, which was galvanized by the sound of a breaking teacup in the Chan Hall:

Later life

Xuyun tirelessly worked as a bodhisattva, teaching precepts, explaining sutras, and restoring old temples. He worked throughout Asia, creating a following across Burma, Thailand, Malaya, and Vietnam, as well as Tibet and China. He remained in China during World War II.  In the winter of 1942, Xuyun held a 'Protect the Nation, Quell the Disaster, Mahākaruṇā Dharma Assembly that lasted over three months long in Chongqing, the capital of China at that time.  He stayed after the rise of the People's Republic of China to support the Buddhist communities rather than retreat to the safety of Hong Kong or Taiwan.

In the spring of 1951, Xuyun and twenty-five monks were being accused of hiding weapons and treasure. They were arrested and tortured in Yunmen Monastery (雲門寺; Yunmen Si) in Shaoguan, Guangdong province. Some of the monks were tortured to death or suffered broken bones. Xuyun endured several savage beatings during the interrogations, causing fractures in his rib cage. He closed his eyes and would not talk, eat, or drink, and stayed in the samādhi for nine days with his attendants, Fayun and Kuanchun waited on him. Several of his works on scriptural commentary were also destroyed. Li Jishen who was the Vice Chairman of PRC informed and seek help from the then Premier of PRC, Zhou Enlai who managed to put an end to the abused incident after three months. It was known as "Yunmen Incident".

In 1953, along with Dharma Master Yuan Ying and others, Xuyun formed the Chinese Buddhist Association at Kuang Chi (Extensive Aid) Monastery where he was Honorary President. The following resolutions were proposed to the government:
 In all places, further destruction of monasteries and temples, the desecration of images, and the burning of sutras shall immediately cease; 
 The intimidation of bhikshus and bhikshunis to force their return to lay life will not be tolerated; and 
 All monastery property shall be returned forthwith, and there should be returned to the Sangha enough arable acreage to make the monasteries self-supporting.

The petition was approved. He then represented the Association in receiving three gifts from a Buddhist delegation from Sri Lanka. Hsu Yun also responded to the invitation of Dharma Master Nan T'ung (Penetration to the South) to head another Dharma assembly at Lang Shan (Wolf Mountain) Monastery, where several thousand people from all over took refuge in Triple Gems. He returned to Shanghai in the third lunar month, and the next month received a telegram from Peking requesting his presence in the Capital. Hsu Yun arrived and stayed at Kuang Chi (Extensive Aid) Monastery (Guangji Temple (Beijing)). Representatives of various Buddhist groups also were present, and the Chinese Buddhist Association was officially inaugurated. After a plenary meeting in which important policies were decided, some monks suggested to him some changes to precepts and rules. Xuyun then scolded them and wrote an essay about the manifestation of the Dharma Ending Age.

Death
Xuyun became ill in the summer of 1959 and died in October 13 of the same year.

Significance 
In 1953, the Chinese Buddhist Association was established at a meeting with 121 delegates in Beijing. The meeting also elected a chairman, 4 honorary chairmen, 7 vice-chairmen, a secretary general, 3 deputy secretaries-general, 18 members of a standing committee, and 93 directors. The 4 elected honorary chairmen were the Dalai Lama, the Panchen Lama, the Grand Lama of Inner Mongolia, and Xuyun himself.

Publications 

 Empty Cloud: The Autobiography of the Chinese Zen Master Xu Yun

Notes

References
 
 Gauci, Damian, John (2011). Chan-Pure Land: An Interpretation of Xu Yun's (1840-1959) Oral Instructions, Chung-Hwa Buddhist Journal 24, 105-120
 Huimin Bhiksu (2009). An Inquiry Into Master Xuyun’s Experiences of Long-dwelling in Samadhi, Chung-Hwa Buddhist Journal 22, 45-68
 Hunn, Richard (ed.), translated by Charles Luk (1974). Empty Cloud: the Autobiography of the Chinese Zen Master Hsu Yun. Rochester: Empty Cloud Press. Shaftesbury: Element Books, 1988 (revised)
 Kʻuan Yü Lu (Charles Luk) (1964). "Master Hsu Yun Brief Biography", The Mountain Path, Vol. 1, October 1964, No. 4
 Kʻuan Yü Lu (Charles Luk) (1961). Ch'an and Zen teaching, London : Rider. 
 Kʻuan Yü Lu; Xuyun (1993). Master Hsu Yun's discourses and dharma words, Hong Kong : H. K. Buddhist book distributor. 
 Hsuan Hua (1983,1985). A Pictorial Biography of the Venerable Master Hsu Yun - Vol.1 and Vol.2 (2nd edition 2003). Burlingame, Calif.: Buddhist Text Translation Society, Dharma Realm Buddhist Univ.  
 Sakya, Jy Din (1996). Empty Cloud: The teachings of Xu Yun. A remembrance of the Great Chinese Zen Master, Hong Kong : H. K. Buddhist book distributor

External links 
There are two institutions under the name "Zen Buddhist Order of Hsu Yun": one at hsuyun.org and another at zatma.org
List of books on the life and teachings of Master Hsu Yun.
Testimonies of awakening
虛雲和尚年譜 
Master Xuyun Memorial Photographic Library

Longevity claims
1959 deaths
Chan Buddhist monks
Chinese Zen Buddhists
Rinzai Buddhists
Soto Zen Buddhists
Year of birth uncertain
1840 births